Homme au bain may refer to:

 Homme au bain (painting), a painting by the Impressionist Gustave Caillebotte.
 Man at Bath, a French film titled Homme au bain in its native language.